Adam Glass (born August 12, 1968 in Decatur, Georgia) is an American comic book writer, screenwriter and television producer best known for his work on the TV series Supernatural, Cold Case and Criminal Minds. As a comic writer, he wrote such titles as Deadpool and Luke Cage for Marvel Comics, and wrote "The New 52" phase of Suicide Squad in DC Comics. His work Rough Riders was published in 2016 by AfterShock.

Filmography 

 Blue Collar TV writer and supervising producer (2004–2005)
 The Cleaner writer and consulting producer (2008–2009)
 Cold Case writer and producer (2009–2010)
 Supernatural writer and executive producer (2010–2015)
 Criminal Minds: Beyond Borders writer and executive producer (2016–2017)
 In From the Cold writer and executive producer (2022)

Bibliography 

Marvel

 Luke Cage Noir #2-4 (2009)
 Deadpool: Suicide Kings #3-5 (2009)
 Deadpool Pulp #2-4 (2010)
 Deadpool Team-Up #897 (2010)
 Deadpool #1000 (2010)

DC Comics

 Flashpoint: Legion of Doom #1-3 (2011)
 JLA 80-Page Giant 2011 #1 (2011)
 Suicide Squad #1-19 (2011–2013)
 The Joker: Death of the Family (2013)

AfterShock

 Rough Riders (2016)

References

External links 

Living people
1968 births
American television writers
American film producers
American comics writers
People from Decatur, Georgia
Screenwriters from Georgia (U.S. state)